Vilen Nikolaevich Ivanov (born July 6, 1934 in Poltava, Soviet Union) – a Russian sociologist, Ph.D., Professor, corresponding member of the Russian Academy of Sciences (RAS); since October, 2005 he has been a RAS adviser; member of the Bureau for Social Sciences under the RAS; Vice-President of the Russian Academy of Social Sciences; Editor-in-Chief of the Nauka. Kultura. Obshchestvo Journal; member of the Presidium of Moscow Sociological Association; honorary member of the Russian Association of Sociologists; full member of the Belarusian Academy of Social Sciences; Vice-President of the International Academy of Russia-Belarus Union; member of the Union of Russian Writers; full member of the Academy of Literature (since 2006). 
V. Ivanov is the author of more than 400 scientific publications (monographs, manuals, brochures) and of 11 collections of poems.
He graduated from the Lenin Political-Military Academy with honours.
From 1983 to September 1988 V. Ivanov was Director of the Institute of Sociological Research under the Academy of Sciences of the USSR.
From 1991 to 2005 he was the first Deputy Director of the Institute of Socio-Political Research of the Russian Academy of Sciences (ISPR RAS)
At present time he is Deputy Head of the Sociology Department for National Security and Federalism under the ISPR RAS.

Awards and Prizes
Order of Friendship (1986);
Medal for Serving the Motherland, 2nd degree 
The Order “Renascence of Russia, 21st century”;
Gold Medal for the Assembly of Russian Peoples.

See also
Institute of Socio-Political Research

External links
The Institute of Socio-Political Research (in Russian)
Official site of the Russian Academy of Sciences

Sources
V.N. Ivanov’s biography (in Russian)

1934 births
Living people
Writers from Poltava
Russian sociologists
Corresponding Members of the Russian Academy of Sciences
Lenin Military Political Academy alumni